Alba González Villa (born October 27, 1986), known professionally as Alba Flores, is a Spanish actress. She is best known for her roles as Saray Vargas in Vis a Vis (Locked Up) and Nairobi in La Casa de Papel (Money Heist). She identifies as lesbian.

Early life and education
Alba Flores is the only daughter of musician and composer Antonio Flores and Ana Villa, a theatrical producer. Her family consists of Romani performers, musicians, and actors: She is the granddaughter of Lola Flores, known as "La Faraona" ("The Pharaoh"), niece of singers Lolita Flores and
Rosario Flores, and cousin of actress Elena Furiase.
Her paternal grandfather,  referred to as "El Pescaílla" was also a Spanish singer and guitarist, and is considered to be one of the fathers of Catalan Rumba. He was Romani. 

Alba studied dramatic interpretation from the age of thirteen, with secondary training in piano performance. In her brief career onstage, she performed in a number of roles, most notably in Luna de miel en Hiroshima (Honeymoon in Hiroshima) (2005), and the Rromani version of A Midsummer Night's Dream (2007).

Career

2005–2014: Career beginnings
In 2005, Alba made her cinematic debut with Chus Gutiérrez's, El calentito, with Verónica Sánchez, Ruth Díaz, Macarena Gómez, Estíbaliz Gabilondo, and Lluvia Rojo among other performers.

In television, she first participated in an episode of the series the El comisario in 2006. In 2008, she landed a role in the Antenna 3 television series . The same year she performed in the musical theater production of Enamorados anónimos (Love Anonymous: The Copla Musical in Broadway) helmed by dance choreographer Blanca Li and music composer Javier Limón.
 

She trained at the Corazza Acting Studio by the renowned acting coach Juan Carlos Corazza. She's one of the generation of actors of the studio, a list that includes Javier Bardem, an Oscar Awards winning actor. She participated in the studio's 2011 theater play, Comedia Y Sueno (Comedia and Dream, the most beautiful lie).

2013–2014: Television roles
Beginning in 2013, she was cast in a main role as the protagonist's Moroccan servant, Jamila, in the Antena 3 series El tiempo entre costuras (The Time in Between), set in Spain and the Northern Protectorates in Morocco, following the Spanish Civil War. She then played an Indian woman in the movie made for TV based on the life of  Spanish Missionary Vicente Ferrer. Filming took place in Anantapur, India.
This was followed by an appearance in the TVE series Cuéntame as an important witness in a plot involving corrupt police.

2015–2019: Career breakthrough

From 2015 to 2019, she played the character named Saray Vargas de Jesús, a Rromani woman who initially faced a 5-year prison sentence for Assault in Vis a Vis (Locked Up). The show suffered comparisons to Orange is the New Black before the premiere due to similar prison setting, however, after the initial episodes, was proven that the two shows are different in themes in which Vis a Vis is more of a high octane thriller Drama and Dark Humor as to the Comedy Drama of Orange is the New Black. Considered a clever and thrilling breakout out hit by critics and fans alike, the show gave Flores her first breakout role in television. For this, she received her first TV Award, a shared Best Female Performer in Fiction Award with the female cast via Ondas Awards, a Best Supporting Actress in a Television Series Award for Spanish Actors Union Awards and several other acting citations.
In 2017, Netflix bought Global streaming rights for the show. With a strong following, the show run for a total of four seasons and an additional spinoff called Vis a Vis: Oasis premiered in 2020. Flores, who played an essential character on the main show had a special guest appearance in the finale to close the series.

2017–present: International recognition with La Casa de Papel

While working with Álex Pina in Vis a Vis, the producer called her and asked if she was interested in joining his new show La Casa de Papel (Money Heist). She didn't go to an audition process. Instead, Pina wrote a role specifically for her as one of the bank robbers on the show nicknamed Nairobi, an expert in counterfeiting and forgery and the team's Quality Control Manager who's in charge in printing the money in Parts One and Two and overseeing the melting of gold in Parts Three and Four. 
 
After the series was cancelled after its one-season run, Netflix acquired the show's Global Streaming rights late 2017, the cast was called back for production and since then Money Heist gained worldwide critical recognition, becoming Netflix's most viewed non-English series. Due to the massive popularity of the show worldwide, Netflix, ordered additional seasons prompting the producers, writers and cast members to return to the show. The series received critical acclaim for its sophisticated plot and engaging characters as well as winning several awards including best drama series at the International Emmy Awards. Her role as Nairobi brought her international recognition as well as numerous acting citations. She won a Iris Award for Best Actress as well as several nominations for her work as Nairobi.

Other works

She served as the Spanish narrator for the Netflix made documentary entitled Night on Earth.

Theatre

In between working in television she also performs in theatre plays. Some of her recent notable works are: 
The 2016 Spanish Representation La Rosa Tatuada by Tennessee Williams.
The Troyanas, based on the tragedy written by Greek playwright Euripides about the Women of Troy after the end of Trojan War. She played Políxena, the daughter of the King of Troy who was sacrificed after the fall of Troy. It premiered on Mérida International Classical Theatre Festival. Flores was nominated for Best Supporting Actress Award in Spanish Actors Union Awards for her performance.
The musical play "Drac Pack" written by her Vis a Vis co-star and friend Najwa Nimri and the Spanish version of La excepción y la regla by German Playwright Bertolt Brecht wherein she was nominated for Best Theatre Actress on Fotogramas de Plata.

Theatre works

Personal life

Her father, Antonio Flores composed a song dedicated for her entitled "Alba". She was nine years old when her father died, two weeks after her grandmother, Lola Flores died.

Flores is vegetarian and has campaigned on behalf of the Latin division of People for the Ethical Treatment of Animals, saying that, "You have to leave the animals off the plate".

In March 2022 she was amongst 151 international feminists signing Feminist Resistance Against War: A Manifesto, in solidarity with the Feminist Anti-War Resistance initiated by Russian feminists after the Russian invasion of Ukraine.

Filmography

Film 

|2021 | Netflix
|Sky High|| Hasta el Cielo
|Estrella

Television

Awards and nominations

References

External links 

Actresses from Madrid
Spanish television actresses
Spanish film actresses
1986 births
Living people
Web series actresses
Spanish Romani people
21st-century Spanish actresses
Romani actresses
Romani rights activists
Spanish feminists
Spanish lesbian actresses
Romani feminists